La Quinta may refer to:
 La Quinta, a house listed on The National Register of Historic Places in Bartlesville, Oklahoma, United States
 La Quinta, California, a resort city in Riverside County
 La Quinta, Cuba, a small town in Villa Clara
 La Quinta Inns & Suites, a hotel chain
 La Quinta Formation, a geological formation in Venezuela and Colombia
 La Quinta Formation, Mexico, an amber-bearing Mexican formation

See also 

 Quinta (disambiguation)